Los chiflados del batallón is a 1975 Argentine film directed by Enrique Dawi.

Cast

 Adriana Aguirre

External links
 

1975 films
Argentine musical comedy films
1970s Spanish-language films
Films directed by Enrique Dawi
1970s Argentine films